In weather forecasting, decoupling is boundary-layer decoupling of atmospheric layers over land at night.  During the day when the sun shines and warms the land, air at the surface of the earth is heated and rises.  This rising air mixes the atmosphere near the earth.   At night this process stops and air near the surface cools as the land loses heat by radiating in the infrared.  If winds are light, air near the surface of the earth can become much colder, compared to the air above it, than if more mixing of air layers occurred.

Weather forecasting